Lawrence Smith or Laurence Smith may refer to:

J. Lawrence Smith (chemist) (1818–1883), American chemist
J. Lawrence Smith (New York politician) (1816–1889), New York lawyer, assemblyman, district attorney, county judge
Laurence D. Smith (born 1950), historian of psychology
Laurence Dwight Smith (1895–1952), American author
Lawrence G. Smith, American physician
Lawrence H. Smith (1892–1958), US Representative from Wisconsin
Lawrence J. Smith (born 1941), US Representative from Florida
Lawrence Leighton Smith (1936–2013), American conductor and pianist
Lawrence Smith (cricketer) (born 1964), English cricketer
Lawrence Smith (Oz), fictional character in the HBO drama Oz
Lawrence Smith (footballer, born 1878) (1878–1912), English football player for Manchester United
Lawrence Smith (soccer) (born 1985), American soccer player for Vaasan Palloseura
Lawrence Smith (MP), Member of Parliament (MP) for City of Chester
Lawrence Smith (South Africa), South African Army general

See also
Larry Smith (disambiguation)
Lauren Smith (disambiguation)
Laurence Harding-Smith (1929–2021), Australian fencer
Lawrie Smith (born 1956), British sailor
Lars Olsson Smith (1836–1913), Swedish politician
Lorenzo Smith (born 1972), American singer-songwriter